The Thomas Parr Monument (Indonesian: Tugu Thomas Parr) is a monument located in Bengkulu, Bengkulu, Indonesia and dedicated to Thomas Parr, the British Resident of Bengkulu who was killed in 1807. Constructed the year after his death, it is considered a cultural property of Indonesia.

Location
The Thomas Parr Monument is located along Ahmad Yani Street, in the Kampung Cina (Chinatown) subdistrict of Bengkulu City, Bengkulu. It is not far from the city center, and easily accessed.

This location was originally near the buildings housing the British East India Company government and ruling council. However, since then the area has become predominantly commercial, with several shops and a post office located near the monument.

Description

Three arched openings provide entrance, and six Tuscan or Roman Doric columns surround the monument. The  monument is topped with a dome. Owing to this dome, the mausoleum is also known locally as "Kuburan Bulek" ('Round Grave').

A wooden plaque lies within the monument, though  it is illegible. Alan Harfield, in his 1985 discussion of the British graveyard and monuments in Bengkulu, quotes it as follows:

Around the monument is a small park, with trees and other plants. The park is, in turn, surrounded by an iron fence.

History
Bengkulu (then known as Bencoolen) fell under control of the Honourable East India Company during the 17th century. The company constructed a fortress, Fort Marlborough, and began to govern the region. In 1805, Thomas Parr was appointed Resident of Bencoolen, and introduced the large-scale production of coffee into the region. The monument described Parr as "a benevolent Father" to the Malay residents of Bengkulu, while Indonesian sources describe him as an "arrogant and ferocious man" who constantly interfered with the traditional customs of the Bengkulu populace. During a rebellion against his administration on 27 September 1807, Parr and his aide Charles Murray were killed; three men entered his home, Mount Felix, stabbing and decapitating Parr and inflicting fatal wounds upon Murray. The East India Company quashed the rebellion, and the following year, a monument was constructed to honor Parr.

Though the monument was built as a memorial to Parr and his death, the people of Bengkulu have reinterpreted it as a testament to their willingness to defend their land rights and traditional customs. The monument is a cultural property of Indonesia.

References

Works cited

Bengkulu (city)
Cultural Properties of Indonesia in Bengkulu
Buildings and structures in Bengkulu
Tourist attractions in Bengkulu
1808 establishments in Asia
Monuments and memorials in Indonesia